Arnold, Illinois may refer to:
Arnold, Carroll County, Illinois, an unincorporated community in Carroll County
Arnold, Morgan County, Illinois, an unincorporated community in Morgan County